Mohammad Hadi Saravi Darkolaei (born 6 January 1998 in Amol) is an Iranian Greco-Roman wrestler. He won the gold medal in the 97 kg event at the 2021 World Wrestling Championships held in Oslo, Norway. He also won one of the bronze medals in the 97 kg event at the 2020 Summer Olympics held in Tokyo, Japan. In 2020, he won the gold medal in his event at the Asian Wrestling Championships held in New Delhi, India.

Career 

In 2019, he won the gold medal in the 87 kg event at the Asian U23 Wrestling Championship held in Ulaanbaatar, Mongolia. In the same year, he also competed in the men's 97 kg event at the 2019 World Wrestling Championships held in Nur-Sultan, Kazakhstan. At the 2019 World U23 Wrestling Championship held in Budapest, Hungary, he won one of the bronze medals in the men's 97 kg event.

He won the bronze medal in the 97 kg event at the 2020 Individual Wrestling World Cup held in Belgrade, Serbia. In 2021, he won the gold medal in his event at the 2021 Poland Open held in Warsaw, Poland.

He defeated Arvi Savolainen of Finland in his bronze medal match in the 97 kg event at the 2020 Summer Olympics held in Tokyo, Japan.

He won one of the bronze medals in the 97kg event at the 2022 World Wrestling Championships held in Belgrade, Serbia.

Achievements 

Under 23

References

External links 

 

Living people
Iranian male sport wrestlers
1998 births
Asian Wrestling Championships medalists
Wrestlers at the 2020 Summer Olympics
Olympic wrestlers of Iran
Olympic bronze medalists for Iran
Medalists at the 2020 Summer Olympics
Olympic medalists in wrestling
World Wrestling Championships medalists
People from Amol
Sportspeople from Mazandaran province
21st-century Iranian people
World Wrestling Champions